The Hill Wheatley Downtowner Motor Inn is a historic hotel at 135 Central Avenue in Hot Springs, Arkansas.  It is a ten-story rectangular structure, finished in glass, brick, and metal, in the Mid-Century Modern style.  Its main block is set back from the street, behind a two-story entry retail section. The tower is fronted mainly by balconies with panels of redwood screening to provide visual relief and shade. The hotel was designed in 1965 by Noland Blass Jr. for Hill Wheatley, one of Hot Springs' major promoters. It is one of the only surviving hotels in the city with its own bathhouse.

The property was listed on the National Register of Historic Places in 2016.

See also
National Register of Historic Places listings in Garland County, Arkansas
Downtowner Motor Inn, another NRHP-listed hotel from the same chain in Albuquerque, New Mexico

References

Hotel buildings on the National Register of Historic Places in Arkansas
Buildings and structures in Hot Springs, Arkansas
National Register of Historic Places in Hot Springs, Arkansas
Historic district contributing properties in Arkansas